David The Boy In The Dress is a children's book written by David Walliams and illustrated by Quentin Blake. It is the first book by Walliams, a television comedian best known for the cult BBC show Little Britain. It tells the story of a fourteen-year-old boy called John and a twelve-year-old boy called Dennis who is encouraged by a rebellious friend to dress up as a girl, and the reactions of his family, friends and school. It is aimed at readers aged eight to twelve, and has been adapted into a television film and a musical.

Background 
David Walliams noted that The Boy In The Dress  is personal to him as it draws on the experiences of his childhood. When he was a child, his sisters would dress him up and he played many female roles in school.

Plot 
The story follows a 12-year-old boy named Dennis and his 14-year-old brother John. The boys remain with their father, who resorts to comfort eating after his wife leaves. Dennis is talented in football and is one of the best on his team. However, he deeply misses his mother, who left their family about five years ago, and finds comfort remembering his mother's yellow dress in an old picture. Dennis sees the same dress on the cover of a Vogue magazine and buys a copy from Raj, the local shop owner. But when Dad finds the magazine, he is furious and forces Dennis to throw it away, while John teases him by calling him "Denise". At school that day, Dennis is given detention for kicking a football through an office window. While in detention, he talks to a girl named Lisa James, the prettiest and most fashionable girl in the school. Lisa invites him over to her house, showing Dennis her collection of Vogue magazines and dressing him up in girls' clothing. The two decide to go out in public, with Dennis in an electric blue dress, under the alter ego of "Denise", a French exchange student who speaks very little English. They go to Raj's corner shop. Raj does not recognise Dennis, believing he is "Denise". Later on, they meet a friend of Lisa's named Mac, and he was so impressed by "Denise" that he asks "Denise" on a date, not knowing that it was actually Dennis. Following their success in fooling Raj and Mac, Dennis goes to school with Lisa as "Denise".

In French class, the teacher starts speaking to Dennis in French (which he does not understand), and he ends up criticizing her French accent as a last resort, upsetting her in the progress. At breaktime, Dennis attempts to kick a football, slips, and his disguise falls off. Mr Hawtrey, the headmaster, gets furious and expels him from the school for cross-dressing, forcing Dennis to miss out on playing in an important football match. Dad is enraged and sends Dennis to his room. Darvesh, Dennis's best friend, comes over but is sent back to his home by Dad. Later in the night, Lisa climbs up to Dennis's window and promises him that she'll find a way to get him back in school. 

Persuaded by Darvesh, Dennis attends the game anyway. Maudlin Street, the rival football team, has won the trophy for the past 3 years and holds a notorious reputation for playing rough and dirty. Without Dennis, the "star striker", the Maudlin Street team was way ahead with a score of 6-0, and defeat seemed bound to happen. Right after the first half finishes, Lisa gets up, tells Mac she "needs a hand" and leaves with him. As the second half starts, Lisa opens the changing room door to reveal all the boys on the school's team — including Dennis — wearing all the dresses from her wardrobe. The game starts, and the school's team starts playing in dresses. Dennis immediately scores 2 goals and is "a hundred times happier than he had ever been". With Dennis playing in the team, the score rises from 6-0 to 6-6, and victory was almost near — until one of the Maudlin Street players intentionally injures Dennis, leaving him lying on the ground in pain. It was then that Dennis's dad appears, much to Dennis's surprise, and starts cheering Dennis on. The game ends with a win for the school's team, and everyone celebrates. Mr Hawtrey is still adamant on having Dennis expelled, however, but Dennis's dad steps up and defends him from Mr. Hawtrey. 

Later on, Dennis returns the dress to Lisa and thanks her for "opening his eyes". For a moment, he contemplated confessing his profound affection for Lisa, but in the end, he doesn't and leaves it at "I'll tell you when I'm older". On the way home, Raj informs Dennis that Mr. Hawtrey's sister, Ms. Doris, now buys the Telegraph instead of him and adds that there is "something funny about her". Lisa and Dennis go to Raj's shop the next morning and find out that Ms. Doris is actually Mr Hawtrey cross-dressing in a skirt. The two threaten that unless Dennis is readmitted to the school, they would tell everyone about Mr Hawtrey's cross-dressing habits. Mr Hawtrey gives in and agrees to reinstate Dennis.

At the end of the story, Dennis, his dad, and his brother get over the pain of the loss of Dennis's mother, Dennis and Lisa stay good friends, and John starts to look out for his younger brother more.

Characters 

 Dennis Sims - A 12-year-old boy who lives with his father and his brother John and his mother passed away Dennis' best friend is Darvesh. 
 John Sims – Dennis' 14-year-old brother who is also a pupil at Elm Forest School.
 Dad – Dennis and John's father, whose name is not given in the book. He works as a long-distance lorry driver.
 Darvesh Singh – Dennis' best friend, who is Sikh and is also a student at Elm Forest School and in the football team.
 Jaspreet Kaur – Darvesh's mother who is Sikh.
 Lisa James – A 14-year-old girl who is a pupil at Elm Forest School.
 Ms. Windsor – A teacher of French at Elm Forest School.
 Raj – Owner of a local newspaper shop.
 Mr. Hawtrey – The principal of Elm Forest School.
 Mr. Norris - A PE teacher at Elm Forest School.
 Gareth Small – A 14-year-old boy in Lisa's class who is the captain of the football team.

Literary significance and reception 
Reviewers and the press noted the book's resonance with Walliams's own cross-dressing. As a child, his sisters would dress him up, and he would often act as a female character in school plays. Philip Ardagh in the Guardian noted the novelty of Walliams's light-hearted approach to the themes, compared with treatments in earlier children's books on the subject like Terence Blacker's 2004 title Boy 2 Girl. Nicolette Jones in the Times praised Blake's illustrations and, though she called Walliams' writing "not the finest", noted "Everyone is on the side of freedom and tolerance by the end, for which the book must be applauded."

Controversy 
The Boy in the Dress has been the subject of some controversy. In September 2017, during the Australian Marriage Law Postal Survey, retailer Aldi was criticised in Australia by some customers for selling the book. One customer claimed the book had an "agenda" to "groom and sexualise" children, while another accused Aldi of "child abuse", with some threatening a boycott. Other customers defended the company.

Allusions 
Dennis's father tells him "No more Small England, or whatever it is": a reference to a television programme previously co-written and co-performed by Walliams. French teacher Miss Windsor cuts short a school detention, hoping to get home in time to watch Neighbours, although in America this reference is changed to The Young and the Restless. On page 104, it is mentioned that Lisa has a purple dress she'd copied from one she'd seen Kylie Minogue wear at an awards do.

Publication history 
The book was published in hardcover by HarperCollins in October 2008, with a paperback release scheduled for May 2009. Walliams and his comedy partner Matt Lucas recorded an audiobook of the story, also for HarperCollins, which was released in November 2008. HarperCollins were reported to have signed Walliams for a two-book deal.

Film adaptation
A television film adaptation was produced for BBC One, and aired on Boxing Day 2014 at 6:55pm.

Filming began on 19 October 2014, according to Walliams' Official Twitter page.  Casting for the film was later announced on 21 October 2014.

Stage musical adaptation 

A stage musical adaption of the book was produced by the Royal Shakespeare Company in Stratford-upon-Avon for in winter 2019. The musical is adapted by Mark Ravenhill, features music and lyrics by Guy Chambers and Robbie Williams, and is directed by RSC artistic director Gregory Doran.

References 

2008 British novels
Cross-dressing in literature
Children's books with LGBT themes
British children's novels
Novels by David Walliams
HarperCollins books
British novels adapted into films
2008 children's books
British novels adapted into television shows